Fritz Messner (18 January 1912 – 7 November 1945) was a German field hockey player who competed in the 1936 Summer Olympics. He was a member of the German field hockey team, which won the silver medal. He played three matches as forward.

He was killed in action during World War II.

References

External links
 
profile

1912 births
1945 deaths
German male field hockey players
Olympic field hockey players of Germany
Field hockey players at the 1936 Summer Olympics
Olympic silver medalists for Germany
Olympic medalists in field hockey
Medalists at the 1936 Summer Olympics
German military personnel of World War II
German people who died in Soviet detention